Küre is a town in the Kastamonu Province in the Black Sea region of Turkey. It is the seat of Küre District. Its population is 2,522 (2021).

References

Kure
Küre District
Towns in Turkey